The Lamborghini Centenario is a limited production sports car based on the Lamborghini Aventador which was unveiled at the 2016 Geneva Motor Show to commemorate the 100th birthday of the company's founder, Ferruccio Lamborghini.

Development and introduction 

Lamborghini developed the Centenario to showcase the advancement of new technologies and also as a test bed for the development of new Lamborghini models.

The Centenario is the first Lamborghini automobile to have 3 exhausts and to be deployed with rear-wheel steering. The system is designed to provide added maneuverability at low speed, in a city driving environment, and improved stability at high speed.

This is also the first Lamborghini model to be equipped with the company's new infotainment system. The system consists of a new 10.1-inch portrait screen which also records telemetry, driving data and top speeds.

The car's all-new bodywork from the Aventador also serves as a base for showcasing the new aerodynamic advancements. A twin-deck splitter at the front helps in generating downforce as well as to let air pass through the side of the car while working in conjunction with the side blades. The Centenario also has the largest rear diffusers to ever be incorporated into a car. The diffusers along with the electronically controlled twin deck rear-wing aids further in generating downforce.

In 2018, 11 of the 40 Centenarios were recalled due to being fit with an improper weight rating label.

Specifications 

The Centenario is based on the Aventador SVJ and retains the carbon-fibre monocoque along with aluminium front and rear subframes from the standard Aventador.

The engine is mated to the same 7-speed ISR automated manual gearbox as used on an Aventador along with the all-wheel-drive drivetrain developed by Haldex. The power steering has two turns lock-to-lock. The suspension system is a push-rod design.

The car has three driving modes, namely, "Strada" (for normal city driving), "Sport" (for high performance driving) and "Corsa" (for optimum track performance). The car comes with either leather or Alcantara upholstery on the interior mostly carried over from the Aventador, customizable to the customer's specifications. The interior has a carbon fibre trim along with carbon fibre shift paddles and has sound deadening materials removed.

Performance 

Centenario Roadster 

Lamborghini unveiled the Centenario Roadster at the August 2016 Pebble Beach Concours d'Elegance. The only change from the coupé counterpart is the weight of the car, which is now set to at least  due to the loss of the roof and the addition of chassis reinforcing components. Performance remains the same as that of the coupé.

Production 
A total of 40 cars, (20 coupes and 20 roadsters) were produced, all of which were already sold via invitation to selected customers.

In media 
The Centenario appears as a playable vehicle in the Forza racing video game series, starting with Forza Horizon 3, as well as in the mobile games Asphalt 8: Airborne, Asphalt 9: Legends and Real Racing 3. It also appears in the 2017 science fiction action film Transformers: The Last Knight as the alternate form of the Autobot Hot Rod.

References

External links 

Cars introduced in 2016
Coupés
Flagship vehicles
Centenario
Rear mid-engine, all-wheel-drive vehicles
Vehicles with four-wheel steering
Roadsters